Ongeluluul ("place where one whispers" in Palauan) is a historic stone platform in Melekeok, a community on Babeldaob, the largest island of the island nation of Palau. It is separated from the main road by a small creek. The site is of local historical significance as a place where important secret meetings of local leaders took place, and is a type of site other major Palauan communities have. This platform was erected in 1750, and was the site of two significant peace treaties in Palauan history: one in 1793 and the other in 1870. The latter peace treaty marked the end of organized warfare between the clans of Palau.

The site where the platform is located was listed on the United States National Register of Historic Places in 1976, a time when Palau was part of the US-administered Trust Territory of the Pacific Islands.

References

National Register of Historic Places in Palau
Buildings and structures completed in 1750
Monuments and memorials in Palau